Adairsville High School is a public high school located in Adairsville, Georgia, United States. It serves grades 9-12 for the Bartow County School District.

Academics
Adairsville High School has been accredited by Cognia or its predecessors since 1956. In the U.S. News & World Report 2020 annual survey of public high schools, Adairsville ranked 253rd in Georgia and 11,033rd nationally.

Athletics 
The Adairsville Tigers play in the GHSA's AAA division.

Notable alumni 
 Vic Beasley – National Football League (NFL) defensive end

References

External links

Schools in Bartow County, Georgia
Public high schools in Georgia (U.S. state)